Too Late the Phalarope is the second novel of Alan Paton, the South African author who is best known for writing Cry, the Beloved Country. It was published in 1953, and was the last novel he published before Ah, but Your Land is Beautiful in 1981.

The summary on the dust jacket of the first UK edition reads, in part; 'The setting is again South Africa, but the tragedy this time is of a white man who, for complicated reasons, some of them not unconnected with his childhood and training, succumbs to the very temptations he might have been thought strong enough to resist. His downfall is recorded by his father's sister who watched the train of events, half foreseeing the danger yet unable to prevent it, and now in anguish blames herself.'

The main character is Afrikaner policeman Pieter van Vlaanderen.  While usually enforcing the country's laws, he eventually breaks the apartheid law outlawing sex between blacks and whites.

Phalaropes are shore birds found in Europe, the Americas, Africa and Asia.

References

1953 novels
20th-century South African novels
Apartheid novels
Novels by Alan Paton
Novels set in South Africa